Rio Frio is an unincorporated community in southeastern Real County, Texas, United States.  It lies just off U.S. Route 83, south of the city of Leakey, the county seat of Real County.  Its elevation is 1,483 feet (452 m).  It has a post office with the ZIP code 78879. The town is named after the Frio River, on which it is situated.

References

External links
 Photos and information about Frio

Unincorporated communities in Texas
Unincorporated communities in Real County, Texas